This is a list of non-government schools in Victoria, Australia.  Approximately two-thirds of non-government school students are enrolled in Catholic schools. As such, Catholic schools have been listed separately here.

Catholic schools

Catholic primary schools

Catholic secondary schools

Independent/private schools

Closed schools
 Acacia College
 Brosnan Learning Centre
 Chanel College
 Clyde School
 ERA School
 Frayne College
 ICA Casey College
 ICA Melton College
 Insight Education Centre for the Blind and Vision Impaired
 Kingswood College
 Larmenier Special School
 Lilydale Adventist Academy (became Edinburgh College)
 Macedon Grammar School
 Melbourne City School
 Morongo Girls' College
 Mother of God Primary School
 Mowbray College
 Northcote Farm School
 Presentation College
 Resurrection House
 Samaritan Catholic College
 St. Aloysius Primary School, Caulfield
 St. Augustine's College, Yarraville
 St. Benedict's Primary School, Burwood
 St. James College, Bentleigh (became St. Bede's College)
 St. John's Lutheran School, Geelong
 St. Joseph's College, Melbourne
 St. Michael's School, Springbank
 South Melbourne College
 The Hermitage
 The New Generation College
 Vaucluse College
 Yarralinda School

References 

 Non-government
Non-government